Noche de recién casados ("Night of Newlyweds") is a 1941 Mexican film. It stars Carlos Orellana.

External links
 

1941 films
1940s Spanish-language films

Mexican black-and-white films
1940s Mexican films